Arman Zangeneh (born June 15, 1993) is an Iranian professional basketball player.

He currently plays for Zob Ahan Isfahan BC in the Iranian Super League as well as for the Iranian national basketball team, as a Power Forward. He is 6'8" in height.  He was a member of Iran 3x3 national basketball youth team attending in 2010 Summer Youth Olympics.
He was introduced to national team in 2014 FIBA Asia Cup by Memi Bečirovič, and participated in the 2014 World Cup in Spain and 2019 World Cup in China with the Iranian national basketball team.

References

External links
 
 

1993 births
Living people
Iranian men's basketball players
Basketball players at the 2010 Summer Youth Olympics
Asian Games silver medalists for Iran
Asian Games medalists in basketball
Basketball players at the 2014 Asian Games
Power forwards (basketball)
Mahram Tehran BC players
Medalists at the 2014 Asian Games
2014 FIBA Basketball World Cup players
2019 FIBA Basketball World Cup players